August 9 - Eastern Orthodox liturgical calendar - August 11

All fixed commemorations below are observed on August 23 by Eastern Orthodox Churches on the Old Calendar.

For August 10, Orthodox Churches on the Old Calendar commemorate the Saints listed on July 28.

Feasts

 Afterfeast of the Transfiguration of Our Lord, God, and Savior Jesus Christ.

Saints

 Holy Hieromartyrs Archdeacon Laurence,<ref>Martyr and Archdeacon Laurence of Rome. OCA - Lives of the Saints. OCA - Lives of the Saints.</ref> with Pope Sixtus II, and Hippolutus (258)Great Synaxaristes:  Ὁ Ἅγιος Λαυρέντιος ὁ ἀρχιδιάκονος καὶ οἱ σὺν αὐτῷ Ξυστὸς καὶ Ἰππόλυτος. 10 Αυγούστου. ΜΕΓΑΣ ΣΥΝΑΞΑΡΙΣΤΗΣ.Rev. Sabine Baring-Gould (M.A.). "S. LAURENCE, D.M. (A.D. 258.)." In: The Lives of the Saints. Volume the Ninth: August. London: John C. Nimmo, 1898. pp. 109-110. 
 Deacons Felicissimus and Agapitus of Rome (258)Martyr Felicissimus the Deacon. OCA - Lives of the Saints.
 Martyrs Romanus the Soldier and others, at Rome (258)  (see also August 9)
 Saint Heron the Philosopher.Great Synaxaristes:  Ὁ Ἅγιος Ἤρων ὁ φιλόσοφος. 10 Αυγούστου. ΜΕΓΑΣ ΣΥΝΑΞΑΡΙΣΤΗΣ.
 Holy 6 martyrs of Bizin (or of Libya).

Pre-Schism Western saints

 Holy 165 Martyrs of Rome, soldiers, martyred in Rome under Aurelian (274)
 Virgin-martyrs Bassa, Paula and Agathonica, in Carthage in North Africa.
 Saint Asteria (Hesteria), a martyr venerated in Bergamo in Lombardy in Italy (c. 307) 
 Saint Gerontius (Geraint), a Briton who was King of Damnonia (Devon), now in England, he fell in battle against the pagan Saxons (508)
 Saint Blane (Blaan, Blain), a disciple of Sts Comgall and Canice in Ireland, he was a bishop in Scotland, was buried at Dunblane which was named after him (6th century)Very Rev. John O'Hanlon. "ARTICLE I.- ST. BLANE, OR BLAAN, BISHOP OF CEANN-GARADH, NOW KINGARTH, IN BUTE, SCOTLAND. [SUPPOSED TO HAVE LIVED IN THE SIXTH CENTURY.]" In: Lives of the Irish Saints: With Special Festivals, and the Commemorations of Holy Persons. VOL. VIII. Dublin, 1875. pp. 141-147.
 Saint Deusdedit (6th century) 
 Saint Aredius (Arige, Aregius), an outstanding Archbishop of Lyon in France  (c. 614) 
 Saint Agilberta (Aguilberta, Gilberta), second Abbess of Jouarre Abbey (c. 680) 
 Saint Bertram (Bertelin, Bettelin, Beorhthelm), Wonderworker of Ilam & Stafford, England (8th century)Commemoration of Our Righteous Father Bertram, Wonderworker of Ilam & Stafford. Comp. by Reader Isaac Lambertson. St John's Orthodox Church, Colchester, Essex, England. Retrieved: 19 June, 2019. 
 Saint Thiento and Companions, Abbot of Wessobrunn in Bavaria in Germany, martyred with six of his monks by invading Hungarians (955)

Post-Schism Orthodox saints

 Blessed Laurence of Kaluga, Fool-for-Christ (1515)August 23 / August 10. HOLY TRINITY RUSSIAN ORTHODOX CHURCH (A parish of the Patriarchate of Moscow).Blessed Laurence the Fool-For-Christ at Kaluga. OCA - Lives of the Saints.

New martyrs and confessors

 New Hieromartyr Vyacheslav Zakedsky, Priest (1918)
 New Hieromartyr Athanasius Kislov, Priest (1937)

Other commemorations

 Second Uncovering and Translation of the relics of Venerable Sabbas of Storozhev or Zvenigorod (1998)
 Synaxis of New Martyrs and Confessors of Solovki.

Icon gallery

Notes

References

Sources
 August 10 / August 23. Orthodox Calendar (PRAVOSLAVIE.RU).
 August 23 / August 10. HOLY TRINITY RUSSIAN ORTHODOX CHURCH (A parish of the Patriarchate of Moscow).
 August 10. OCA - The Lives of the Saints.
 The Autonomous Orthodox Metropolia of Western Europe and the Americas (ROCOR). St. Hilarion Calendar of Saints for the year of our Lord 2004. St. Hilarion Press (Austin, TX). p. 59.
 Menologion: The Tenth Day of the Month of August. Orthodoxy in China.
 August 10. Latin Saints of the Orthodox Patriarchate of Rome.
 The Roman Martyrology. Transl. by the Archbishop of Baltimore. Last Edition, According to the Copy Printed at Rome in 1914. Revised Edition, with the Imprimatur of His Eminence Cardinal Gibbons. Baltimore: John Murphy Company, 1916. pp. 238-239.
 Rev. Richard Stanton. A Menology of England and Wales, or, Brief Memorials of the Ancient British and English Saints Arranged According to the Calendar, Together with the Martyrs of the 16th and 17th Centuries. London: Burns & Oates, 1892. p. 389.

 Greek Sources
 Great Synaxaristes:  10 ΑΥΓΟΥΣΤΟΥ. ΜΕΓΑΣ ΣΥΝΑΞΑΡΙΣΤΗΣ.
  Συναξαριστής. 10 Αυγούστου.'' ECCLESIA.GR. (H ΕΚΚΛΗΣΙΑ ΤΗΣ ΕΛΛΑΔΟΣ).

 Russian Sources
  23 августа (10 августа). Православная Энциклопедия под редакцией Патриарха Московского и всея Руси Кирилла (электронная версия). (Orthodox Encyclopedia - Pravenc.ru).

August in the Eastern Orthodox calendar